The 2019 Los Angeles Gladiators season was the second season of Los Angeles Gladiators's existence in the Overwatch League and their second season under head coach David "dpei" Pei. The Gladiators looked to improve upon their 2018 season, when they qualified for the season playoffs but fell in the quarterfinals to the London Spitfire.

Los Angeles struggled early on in the season, losing four of their first five matches, and did not qualify for the Stage 1 Playoffs. The team hit their stride in Stage 2 with a 6–1 record and claimed the fourth seed in the Stage 2 Playoffs; however, they lost in the quarterfinals to the New York Excelsior, 0–3. The Gladiators' performance dropped in Stage 3, as they were only able to amass a 4–3 for the stage and missed out on Stage 3 Playoffs by one spot. With the implementation of an enforced 2-2-2 role lock by the league in Stage 4, Los Angeles won three of their first six matches in the stage. The Gladiators closed out the season with a 3–1 victory over the Los Angeles Valiant at the Valiant's homestand weekend at The Novo, giving the team an 18–11 overall record and the fifth seed in the season playoffs.

The Gladiators began their playoff run with a 4–3 victory over the Hangzhou Spark in the first round, marking the team's first ever playoff series win, including stage playoffs, in franchise history. The win advanced the team to the first round in the upper bracket, but they fell 2–4 to the Vancouver Titans, sending them to the lower bracket. Los Angeles' season came to an end the following match, when they were swept 0–4 by the San Francisco Shock.

Preceding offseason

Player re-signings 
From August 1 to September 9, 2018, all Overwatch League teams that competed in the 2018 season could choose to extend their team's players' contracts. On August 20, Gladiators transferred main tank Baek "Fissure" Chan-hyung to Seoul Dynasty after a public dispute with the team. The team elected not to re-sign three of their players – Ted "silkthread" Wang, Luis "iRemiix" Galarza Figueroa, and Choi "Asher" Jun-sung.

Free agency 
All non-expansion teams could not enter the free agency period until October 8, 2018; they were able to sign members from their respective academy team and make trades until then. On October 25, Gladiators signed DPS Jang "Decay" Gui-un and main tank Gye "rOar" Chang-hoon from Korean Overwatch Contenders team Kongdoo Panthera. On November 28, the team signed support Riku "Ripa" Toivanen from Team Gigantti in Contender's Europe.  Gladiator's final offseason transaction was on December 10, when the team promoted Lee "Panker" Byong-ho from Gladiators Legion on a two-way contract.

Regular season

Stage 1 
Los Angeles began their 2019 season with a match against Seoul Dynasty. Gladiators lost the match; notably, Gladiator's Lane "Surefour" Roberts played Symmetra, marking the first time in Overwatch League history that a team utilized Symmetra in their composition. LA found their first victory three days later against San Francisco Shock. The following, Gladiators fell to Paris Eternal by a score of 1–2. The team dropped both of their matches in week three, falling 1–2 to London Spitfire and 1–3 to Hangzhou Spark. Gladiators finished the stage on a high note by defeating Atlanta Reign and Guangzhou Charge in their final week of the stage to finish with a 3–4 record.

Stage 2 
Gladiators opened Stage 2 with a 3–1 victory over Shanghai Dragons. Los Angeles was able to string off five more consecutive wins, putting the team at a perfect 6–0 record heading into their final regular season match of the stage against Boston Uprising. The team failed to defeat Boston, giving them a 6–1 record for Stage 2 and the fourth seed in the Stage 2 Playoffs.

Gladiators faced New York Excelsior in the Stage 2 Quarterfinals on May 10. Unable to complete a single map, Gladiators were handily defeated by Excelsior, getting swept 0–3.

Stage 3 
Los Angeles began the stage with a match against the Dallas Fuel on June 7. The Gladiators dominated throughout the match, sweeping the Fuel, 4–0. Two days later, the team took on the undefeated Vancouver Titans. While they found some success in the match, an unwillingness to make compositional changes led to a 1–3 loss. Looking to bounce back from the loss, the team next faced the Philadelphia Fusion on June 14. Los Angeles took the first map, Oasis, without much resistance, and while the Fusion were able to push map two, Volskaya Industries, to two overtime rounds, the Gladiators would take that map as well. A win on Eichenwalde cemented the match victory. While the Gladiators lost the final map, Dorado, they won the match 3–1. Two days later, Los Angeles took on the Washington Justice; the Gladiators rolled the Justice, sweeping them 4–0. The team's next match was on June 21 against the Shanghai Dragons. Unable to contain the Dragons' dominant DPS play throughout the match, the Gladiators fell by a score of 1–3. The following week, Los Angeles faced the Toronto Defiant. A quick win on Nepal and another win on Horizon Lunar Colony put the Gladiators up 2–0 going into halftime. The final two maps both went to overtime rounds, but the Gladiators were able to find wins on both to complete a 4–0 sweep over the Defiant. The team's final match of the stage was against the Titans on June 30; the Gladiators were swept, 0–4. With a 4–3 record for Stage 3, Los Angeles finished with the ninth-best record for the stage, missing the stage playoffs by one spot.

Stage 4 
Prior to the start of Stage 4, which would include the implementation of an enforced 2-2-2 role lock by the League, the Gladiators transferred tank Kim "Bischu" Hyung-seok to the Guangzhou Charge for an undisclosed amount of cash.

The Gladiators opened their final stage with a match against the New York Excelsior on July 25. Los Angeles took the first two maps of the match; after dropping map three, the Gladiators won the final map to claim a 3–1 match victory. Two days later, the team took on the Houston Outlaws. Unable to overcome stellar performances by Houston's Dante "Danteh" Cruz and Alexandre "SPREE" Vanhomwegen, the Gladiators fell by a score of 1–3. The following week, Los Angeles faced the Chengdu Hunters. After splitting the first four maps, the match went to a fifth tiebreaker map; the Gladiators were able to pull out a win on the final map and won the match 3–2. The team took on the San Francisco Shock the following day. Los Angeles found themselves up 2–1 going into map four, but the Shock rallied back to tie up the series and bring the match to a fifth tiebreaker map; the Gladiators could not close out the series and lost 2–3. Looking to bounce back after the loss, the team next faced the Dallas Fuel on August 9. Los Angeles dropped the first two maps to go into halftime down 0–2; the team turned it around after the break, winning the next three consecutive maps take a 3–2 win. The following week, the Gladiators took on the Hangzhou Spark. For the fourth match in a row, the series was pushed to a fifth map; the Gladiators failed to win the final map and lost the match 2–3. For their final match of the regular season, the Gladiators headed to The Novo in Los Angeles to play in the Kit Kat Rivalry Weekend, hosted by the Los Angeles Valiant. Their only match of the weekend was against the Valiant on August 24 in the "Battle for LA." The Gladiators closed out the regular season on a high note, rallying to defeat the Valiant, 3–1.

Playoffs 
With a 17–11 regular season record, the Gladiators claimed the fifth seed in the season playoffs. The team opened the double-elimination tournament with a match against the fourth-seeded Hangzhou Spark on September 5. The Spark jumped out to a 1–0 lead after taking the first map win on Busan, but the Gladiators surged back, winning on King's Row, Temple of Anubis, and Rialto. Down 1–3, the Spark mounted their own comeback, winning the following two maps, Lijiang Tower and Eichenwalde. With the series tied 3–3, the match went to Watchpoint: Gibraltar for map seven. On offense, the Gladiators completed the map, and on defense, they held the Spark from reaching the second checkpoint, resulting in a 4–3 match victory. The win gave Los Angeles their first-ever playoff series win, including stage playoffs, in franchise history.

Advancing to the first round of the upper bracket, Los Angeles took on the Vancouver Titans on September 8. Through the first four maps, the two teams traded maps wins, as the series headed to Lijiang Tower tied 2–2. The Titans adapted to the Gladiators' aggressive playstyle and took the map win; Los Angeles was unable to prevent Vancouver from taking map six, Eichenwalde, and lost the series, 2–4. The loss sent the Gladiators to the second round of the lower bracket.

The Gladiators' next match was against the third-seeded San Francisco Shock on September 12. Los Angeles came out flat on the first map, Busan, and found themselves quickly down 0–1. From then on, the Gladiators put on a much better showing, showcasing great ultimate combinations between Chang-hoon "rOar" Gye on Orisa and Gui-un "Decay" Jang on Doomfist. While they were able to keep the battle competitive, the Shock proved to be too much to handle, as Los Angeles fell on King's Row and Horizon Lunar Colony. Down 0–3, the Gladiators sent the match to Rialto for map four. On their attack, the Gladiators completed the map, largely due to a stellar performance by João Pedro "Hydration" Goes Telles on Pharah. However, the Shock responded by completing the map with one of the fastest times in the history of the OWL on their attack; San Francisco won the map in overtime rounds. The 0–4 loss ended the Gladiators' playoff run.

Final roster

Transactions 
Transactions of/for players on the roster during the 2019 regular season:
On July 17, Gladiators transferred Kim "Bischu" Hyung-seok to Guangzhou Charge.

Standings

Record by stage

League

Game log

Regular season

Playoffs

References 

2019 Overwatch League seasons by team
Los Angeles Gladiators
Los Angeles Gladiators seasons